This is a list of mountains in Greenland.

List
For each mountain, the municipality in which it is located is given, along with coordinates indicating the approximate centre of the mountain (follow the link to see satellite images of the location).

Above 3000 m

Above 2000 m

Above 1000 m

Other relevant mountains

See also
List of mountain peaks of Greenland
List of mountain ranges of Greenland
List of nunataks of Greenland
List of Ultras of Greenland

References

Bibliography
Gazetteer of Greenland Compiled by Per Ivar Haug. UBiT, Universitetsbiblioteket i Trondheim, August 2005, .
Exploration and place names in Northeastern Greenland